Joe or Joseph Gonzales may refer to:

Joe Gonzales (baseball) (1915–1996), Major League Baseball pitcher
Joseph Gonzales (footballer) (1907–1984), French footballer
Joseph Gonzales (boxer) (born 1941), French Olympic boxer
Tee Joe Gonzales (Joseph Stonewall Gonzales, 1862–1940), American politician in East Baton Rouge, Louisiana
Joseph Victor Gonzales (born 1960), Malaysian choreographer
Joe Gonzales (attorney), American attorney and politician
Joe Gonzales (wrestler) (born 1957), American Olympic wrestler